British Women's Basketball Championship (born British Basketball League Women) - Women's basketball tournament teams UK. The first draw took place in 1965, which was the team of champions from London "Malory." Most titles - 15 counts in City of Sheffield Hatters from Sheffield.

History

Champions

List of champions

External links
Official site of England Basketball, including the English Basketball League

United Kingdom
Women's basketball competitions in the United Kingdom
Basketball leagues in the United Kingdom